"Weeds" (also known as "The Lonesome Death of Jordy Verrill") is a darkly humorous short story by Stephen King. It was first published in Cavalier magazine in May 1976.

Plot summary
On Independence Day, a backwoods hick farmer in New Hampshire named Jordy Verrill thinks his newfound discovery of a meteorite will provide enough riches to pay off the remaining $200 of his bank loan, but he instead finds himself overcome by a rapidly spreading plant-like organism that arrives in the meteorite when he ends up coming in contact with it. It has been described that Jordy doesn't have much good luck.

After a rainstorm, Jordy sees that the organism has grown roundish grass around where the meteorite struck. Not only are the plants growing on anything he touches that is wet, there are plants growing on his fingers, his left eye, his penis, and his tongue where he starts to get itchy. He can't go to his usual doctor who is out of town on a fishing trip. Upon hearing the words "cold water" in his mind, Jordy gives in to the temptation and takes a bath to relieve the itching caused by the growing plants; however, the water only serves to accelerate the plants' growth on his body.

The next day, Jordy now resembles a plant creature with a roundish head with no visible neck and round shoulders. He can even hear the plants that are now on his property talking. Loading his shotgun, Jordy kills himself declaring himself "lucky at last". The grass continues to grow across his property and is making its way into the nearby town.

Adaptations  	 
The story was adapted into the second segment of the anthology film Creepshow in 1982. The segment was titled "The Lonesome Death of Jordy Verrill", a reference to the Bob Dylan song "The Lonesome Death of Hattie Carroll". Stephen King himself plays Verrill in the adaptation, and the location of Verrill's farm is changed to Maine. The story includes Verrill's humorous daydreams about trying to sell the meteor to an imagined "Department of Meteors" at the community college and his decision not to seek medical attention as he fears a doctor (portrayed by Bingo O'Malley) would amputate his fingers. Plant growth affects everything Jordy touches. As Jordy prepares a bath to soothe his itchy skin, the plants are covering his hands, jaw line, chest, back, and an area that causes Jordy to declare, "Oh no, not there!" He is then visited by the ghost of his father (also portrayed by Bingo O'Malley), who appears in his mirror and warns him not to get in the tub as it is the water that the plants want. Believing he is doomed anyway, Jordy gives in. Over several hours, Jordy is transformed into a plant creature. He ends his existence with a shotgun while praying to god to let his luck be in. A radio forecaster predicts long periods of rain and sunshine as the camera pans across Jordy's farm, now overrun with monstrous vegetation as some of it is starting to go down the road.

See also
 Stephen King short fiction bibliography

Short stories by Stephen King
Horror short stories
Science fiction short stories
1976 short stories
Works originally published in Cavalier (magazine)
Short stories adapted into films